A vodka tonic is a cocktail made with varying proportions of vodka and tonic water. Vodka tonics are frequently garnished with a slice of lime or lemon.

One commonly used recipe is one part vodka and one part tonic water in a tumbler, often a highball glass over ice, with a generous lime wedge squeezed into it.

The drink is referenced in the lyrics of the song "Goodbye Yellow Brick Road" by Elton John.

See also 
 Gin and tonic

References

Cocktails with vodka

ja:ジン・トニック#バリエーション